"This Man" is a song by Jeremy Camp. The song is off his Restored album, which was released in 2004.

Reception 
The single has reached number one on the Billboard Hot Christian Songs chart. It was the twentieth most played song on Christian CHR radio in 2006 and "Breathe", a song from the same album, was the tenth most played song on CHR radio that year. "This Man" has aired on YouTube with video clips from the film The Passion of the Christ.

Appearances
Live versions by Camp appear on his 2005 album, Live Unplugged, and his 2009 album, Jeremy Camp Live. "This Man" is also available on the compilation album WOW Hits 2007.

Charts

Weekly charts

Year-end charts

Decade-end charts

References

2006 singles
Jeremy Camp songs
2004 songs
Songs written by Jeremy Camp